Waldbreitbach is a former Verbandsgemeinde ("collective municipality") in the district of Neuwied, in Rhineland-Palatinate, Germany. In January 2018 it was merged into the new Verbandsgemeinde Rengsdorf-Waldbreitbach. The seat of the Verbandsgemeinde was in Waldbreitbach.

The Verbandsgemeinde Waldbreitbach consisted of the following Ortsgemeinden ("local municipalities"):

 Breitscheid 
 Datzeroth 
 Hausen (Wied) 
 Niederbreitbach 
 Roßbach 
 Waldbreitbach

Former Verbandsgemeinden in Rhineland-Palatinate